Veerappan is a 2016 Indian Hindi-language biographical action crime film written and directed by Ram Gopal Varma. The film is based on the real-life Indian bandit Veerappan and the events leading to Operation Cocoon, a mission to capture and kill him. The film is a remake of the Kannada film Killing Veerappan (2016) starring Shiva Rajkumar. The film stars Sandeep Bharadwaj (who reprises his role from the original), Sachiin J Joshi, Lisa Ray and Usha Jadhav.

The film was released on May 27, 2016. Veerappan received positive reviews with critics praising narration, production design, direction and performances of Sandeep Bharadwaj, and Usha Jadav.

Plot
Koose Muniswamy Veerappan, during his teenage starts working as an assistant to his relative Sevi Gounder, a notorious poacher and sandalwood smuggler. His father and relatives, whose village lay in the forest area, were also known to be poachers and smugglers. Veerappan (Sandeep Bharadwaj), dominant in Sathyamangalam Forest in the states of Tamil Nadu and Karnataka, 
defies the governments, and Indian Border security paramilitary forces, and maintain a small army. He is wanted for killing approximately 184 people, about half of whom were police officers, including senior police and forest officials. He was also wanted for poaching about 200 elephants and smuggling ivory worth US$2,600,000 and about 10,000 tonnes of sandalwood worth approximately US$22,000,000.

In 1991, Veerappan and his chief Intel Gandhi, behead IFS Officer P. Srinivas. Years later, Veerappan avenges the death of his close associate Gandhi by misleading Special Task Force (STF) personnel in their covert operation, through Gandhi's unnamed notorious informer. The covert mission led by T. Harikrishna S.P., and his informer S.I. Shakeel Ahmed to kill Veerappan fails miserably. Veerappan and his army brutally assassinate all the STF officers in the operation and snatch their arms.

The Tamil Nadu STF chief K. Vijay Kumar I.P.S. appoints his associate, an undercover I.P.S. spy in the Karnataka region, a master-strategist (Sachiin J Joshi), who puts in place the Operation Cocoon through a network of tribals, and informers, such as a Deputy spy, a woman STF spy and landlord (Lisa Ray), who befriends and rents out house to Muthulakshmi-the wife of Veerappan (Usha Jadhav). On the other hand, a team of loyal undercover cops led by Rambo Krishna, leave Palar base of STF, near M. M. Hills,  from Kollegal of Karnataka along with a team of 41 members which includes police from two states, forest officials, forest watchers and informers. The team travels in two vehicles, of which one is a bus carrying most of the team members, and a jeep carrying K. Gopalakrishnan, the IPS officer. Veerappan's gang plants landmines on the road in more than 14 places to halt their approach, and during the Palar blast, K. Gopalakrishnan, standing on the footboard of the jeep, is thrown out, and suffer severe injuries, leaving the police to retaliate and ultimately prevent the snatching of arms.

After few failed attempts, including the one led by another undercover cop, disguised as a subordinate to Islamic underworld don - Kadaani, to negotiate an arms deal with Veerappan's gang, the STF team led by master-strategist, and an ex-spy turned timberyard owner-Kumar, finally succeed on 18 October 2004. On that day, Veerappan is escorted out of the forest by Kumar, who earlier infiltrates Veerappan's gang in disguise to negotiate another arms deal with Velupillai Prabhakaran. Subsequently, Veerappan and his men board an ambulance stationed at Papparapatti village in Dharmapuri district. Veerappan and his men are first warned and then asked to surrender, which was denied, and the men start firing at the STF personnel. The STF retaliate by firing grenades and gunfire, subsequently, Veerappan and his men are killed on the spot.

Cast 
 Sandeep Bharadwaj as Veerappan
 Sachiin Joshi as Cop
 Lisa Ray as Shreya
 Usha Jadhav as Muthulakshmi
 Nissar Khan as Vijay Kumar
 Krishna Srikanth Iyengar as Kumar (Ex Cop)
 Chetanya Adib as Shashi
 Raj Singh Arora as Gopal
 Sunit Razdan as Bhupi
 Vineet Sharma as Dinesh
 Navin Prabhakar as Rajan
 Akash Sinha as Govindan
 Shaneel Sinha as Gandhi
 Raj Premi as Madhani
 Zareen Khan As Item number Khallas

Production
Pratik Vijay Redij is the production designer for the film. Following the success of Ram Gopal Varma's second docudrama, Killing Veerappan, Varma met with Sachiin J Joshi, and emphasized his interest in developing an international biopic version in Hindi language with a new cast and crew. The biopic depicts the dramatic rise of Veerappan. In an Interview with "Indian Express" Varma stated that “Making Veerappan is not about glorifying a criminal, but it is to put a mirror to how he was allowed to happen in the first place”.

Reception
Upon its release, Veerappan received mixed reviews with critics praising narration, production design, direction and performances of Sandeep Bharadwaj, and Usha Jadav. In an Interview with "Indian Express" Varma stated that “Making Veerappan is not about glorifying a criminal, but it is to put a mirror to how he was allowed to happen in the first place”. The CBFC has cleared the film with a single cut. The "Times of India" gave the film 3.5/5 for its visual appeal, and 3/5 for direction.
The Song Khallas was directly lifted from Get Low, by DJ Snake.

Soundtrack

References

External links
 

Indian biographical films
2010s Hindi-language films
2016 films
Films shot in Tamil Nadu
Films shot in Karnataka
Films directed by Ram Gopal Varma
Indian avant-garde and experimental films
2016 crime action films
Indian crime action films
Films scored by Jeet Ganguly
Films scored by Sharib-Toshi
Indian docudrama films
2010s biographical films
Biographical action films
Action films based on actual events
Crime in Karnataka
Biographical films about bandits
Films set in forests
Indian spy action films
Hindi remakes of Kannada films
Indian films based on actual events
Films set in Tamil Nadu
Films set in Karnataka
2010s avant-garde and experimental films
Illegal logging in India